David Wu (born 1955) is a Democratic member of the U.S. House of Representatives for Oregon.

David Wu may also refer to:

David Wu (American actor) (born 1966), Taiwanese-born Chinese-American film actor, TV personality and former Channel V VJ
David Wu (Hong Kong actor), naturalized Canadian film director, former Hong Kong kung fu film actor 
David Wu (entrepreneur) (born 1970), founder and CEO of RotoHog.com
S. David Wu, president of Baruch College of the City University of New York